The (Great) Book of Lecan (Irish: Leabhar (Mór) Leacáin) (RIA, MS 23 P 2) is a medieval Irish manuscript written between 1397 and  1418 in Castle Forbes, Lecan (Lackan, Leckan; Irish Leacán), in the territory of Tír Fhíacrach, near modern Enniscrone, County Sligo. It is in the possession of the Royal Irish Academy.

Leabhar Mór Leacáin is written in Middle Irish and was created by Ádhamh Ó Cuirnín for Giolla Íosa Mór Mac Fhirbhisigh. The material within was transcribed from the Book of Leinster, latter copies of the Book of Invasions, the dinsenchas, the banshenchas and the Book of Rights.

At one stage it was owned by James Ussher. After it was seized from Trinity College Dublin by troops under the command of Sir John Fitzgerald, 2nd Baronet in 1689 during the Williamite War in Ireland, James II of England deposited it at the Irish College, Paris. In 1787, the Chevalier O'Reilly returned it to Ireland, where it was at one stage in the possession of Charles Vallancey. He passed it on to the Royal Irish Academy.

There were originally 30 folios; the first nine were apparently lost in 1724. These contained a large section devoted to the pedigrees and history of the Norse and Norse-Gaelic families of Ireland, which are nowhere else preserved.

The pages are covered in a greasy substance which makes them transparent and reduces their legibility.

See also

Uí Fiachrach

External links
Irish Script on Screen has a facsimile

References

Irish-language literature
Medieval literature
15th-century manuscripts
Early Irish literature
Irish texts
1410s books
Irish manuscripts
Royal Irish Academy Library
Irish books
Medieval Ireland